The Tianqiao and Chrissy Chen Institute (also referred to as the Chen Institute or TCCI) is a non-profit institute founded by husband and wife Tianqiao Chen and Chrissy Luo with the aim of supporting study into the human brain. In 2016 the couple committed US$1 billion to support the institute’s work, which focuses on research in three core areas – brain discovery, brain treatment and brain development. Towards that end, the institute supports interdisciplinary research concerning neuroscience, particularly research on brain mechanics, perception, and the impact of perception on behavior and well-being.

History

Background 
The Chen Institute was founded by Chrissy and Tianqiao Chen, both philanthropists known for co-founding the Chinese conglomerate Shanda Group in 1999. They decided to create the Chen Institute to fund various brain-related research initiatives and institutions, citing a project by Caltech scientist Richard Andersen as being particularly inspirational. Upon seeing Richard A Andersen's, who along with David J. Anderson directs part of T&C Chen Institute, mind-machine brain interface help a quadriplegic use thoughts to control a robotic arm on television, they flew from Singapore to Caltech in Pasadena, California to meet Anderson in person. The couple subsequently set aside $1 billion to donate to related efforts on brain-related treatment, as well as research and development.  They then spent two years researching possible partners.
 
In March 2017, the Tianqiao and Chrissy Chen Institute announced a plan to annually donate around $100 million each year. With the goal of "[passing] the ball to whoever is closest to the goal," new proposals from universities would be gauged for at least a year each, and after that point, money would be donated to scientists directly.

Caltech institute 

In its first donation, on December 8, 2016, it was announced that the Chen Institute was donating $115 million to fund the formation of the Tianqiao and Chrissy Chen Institute for Neuroscience at Caltech. The Chens stated that they selected Caltech as the first recipient because of the school's entrepreneurial and interdisciplinary approach to the field. The $115 million Caltech donation resulted in some controversy in Chinese academia, with arguments made that the donations would have been more beneficial to a Chinese university. Other academics defended the donation on the grounds that Chinese universities were often less transparent, noting that the Chens had previously withheld gifts to Chinese institutions when they refused to provide usage reports.

The funds were set aside to establish the new institute's building and provide Caltech with continuous resources for neuroscience research, with direction of that research to be decided by the university. It was announced that the Chen Neuroscience Research Building would serve as the administrative center for the Tianqiao and Chrissy Chen Institute for Neuroscience, and house seven interdisciplinary research centers which together formed "the core of the Chen Institute." The university explained that the research complex would combine "biology, engineering, chemistry, physics, computer science and the social sciences to tackle brain function in an integrated, comprehensive way."

In August 2017, it was announced that David J. Anderson would serve as director of the Tianqiao and Chrissy Chen Institute for Neuroscience. Also that month, plans for the new Caltech building were heard by the design commission of Pasadena. The groundbreaking of the Tianqiao and Chrissy Chen Neuroscience Research Building took place in December 2017. With construction beginning in January 2018, the opening occurred in January 2021.

Shanghai institute 
In November 2017, the Tianqiao and Chrissy Chen Institute announced that $80 million would fund The Tianqiao and Chrissy Chen Institute (Shanghai). The nonprofit brain disease institute was formed as a partnership with Huashan Hospital in Shanghai, which in turn is affiliated with Fudan University, and Zhou Liangfu Foundation. The institute announced a focus on international collaboration and brain disease research, with plans to study "brain tumors, Alzheimer’s disease, Parkinson’s disease, depression and other brain ailments."

In June 2018, the institute announced that it was partnering with the Shanghai Mental Health Center to fund the study of mental illness.

Chen Frontier Lab for Brain Research 
In October 2020, the Tianqiao and Chrissy Chen Institute opened its first "Chen Frontier Lab for Brain Research" at Huashan Hospital's Hongqiao Campus in Shanghai. The Chen Frontier Lab for Applied Neurotechnology seeks to achieve accomplishments in four dimensions: scientific research, talent development, standards formulation and industry research. It has a particular focus on Brain-Machine Interface, Sleep and Dreams, Cognitive Assessment, Diagnosis & Intervention and Digital Medicine.

In July 2021, TCCI announced that it had signed an agreement with Shanghai Mental Health Center to open a second Frontier focused on artificial intelligence and mental health. At the ceremony, Professor Xu Yifeng, Director of Shanghai Mental Health Center, touched on the Center’s concerted exploration of brain disease and its treatment and preventions for mental disorders.

Areas of focus and mission 

The Tianqiao and Chrissy Chen Institute is interested in three core areas: brain discovery, brain treatment, and brain development. In particular, the institute aims to support fundamental brain research with a focus on "understanding the sensation-perception mechanisms and related systems of memory, attention, learning and expectations." The institute's stated goal is to fund universities and institutions in forms such as endowed institutes, grants for researchers, professorships, or "topic-specific programs" for scientists.

Co-founder Tianqiao Chen has explained that "the key of [the institute's] philanthropy vision" is furthering understanding of perception, arguing that such research would help people master negative emotions. According to Chen, “for thousands of years, we improved our happiness through changing the physical world. We now have to solve this problem by exploring inward.

Programs and institutions 

The Tianqiao and Chrissy Chen Institute for Neuroscience at Caltech
The T&C Chen Brain-Machine Interface Center
The T&C Chen Center for Social and Decision Neuroscience
The T&C Chen Center for Systems Neuroscience
The Center for Molecular and Cellular Neuroscience
The Chen Center for Data Science and Artificial Intelligence
The Caltech Brain Imaging Center
The Tianqiao and Chrissy Chen Institute (Shanghai)

Research and recognition 

Since its inception, researchers at the Tianqiao and Chrissy Chen Institute at Caltech have published research on topics such as aiding paralyzed patients feel sensation, the neural processes associated with fear, deciphering how the brain manages thirst, the mechanisms behind memory recollection, the neural codes for body movements, and others.
 
A number of Tianqiao and Chrissy Chen Institute researchers have received awards for their work. Institute researchers at Huashan Hospital, for example, received two National Science and Technology Awards in 2017 for their work on “Basic and Clinical Innovation Methods for Cerebral Fluid Through Surgery.”

Documentary
The institute commissioned the documentary Minds Wide Open, which aired on the Discovery Channel in 2018. An hour long, according to Barron's it "builds a case for why scientists need to focus on very basic questions of how the brain works and gives special attention to several young scientists who are on the verge of breakthroughs." The film won Gold Awards in the 2018 Cannes Corporate Media & TV Award film categories of medical, educational, and science and technology.

References

External links
 

Neuroscience research centers in California
California Institute of Technology buildings and structures
Non-profit organizations based in California